The Great Northern Railway (GNR) Class J13, classified J52 by the LNER is a class of  steam locomotive intended primarily for shunting.

The Class J13 were introduced in 1897 designed by Henry Ivatt based on the earlier domeless GNR Class J14 (LNER Class J53).  Eighty-five   J13s were built up to 1909.  Several J14s were rebuilt as J13s from 1922.

Sub-classes
Some locomotives were fitted with condensing apparatus for working on the Metropolitan Railway.  Condensing apparatus was added to, or removed from, locomotives when they were allocated to, or away from, the London area.

The LNER reclassified the J13 as J52.  They also introduced two subclasses, J52/1 for the rebuilt engines and J52/2 for the originals.  Forty-eight J52/1s and eighty-five J52/2s passed to British Railways in 1948 and they were numbered 68757–68889.

Accidents
On May 20th, 1952, No. 68790 collided with an NCB locomotive.

Preservation
One, 8846 was privately preserved by Captain Bill Smith in 1959 and became the first locomotive to be privately preserved from BR. In 1980 it was donated to the National Railway Museum and made regular visits to other preserved railways and museums on its two Boiler Ticket durations in preservation.

Sources

External links 
 The Stirling J52 & J53 (GNR J13 & J14) 0-6-0ST Locomotives LNER Encyclopedia

J13
0-6-0ST locomotives
Railway locomotives introduced in 1897
Standard gauge steam locomotives of Great Britain
Robert Stephenson and Company locomotives
Sharp Stewart locomotives
Shunting locomotives